Maria Frolova (born 1 November 1986) is a Russian volleyball player for VC Yenisey Krasnoyarsk and the Russian national team.

She participated at the 2017 Women's European Volleyball Championship, and the 2017 FIVB Volleyball World Grand Prix, and 2017 FIVB Volleyball Women's World Grand Champions Cup.

References

1986 births
Living people
People from Orenburg
Russian women's volleyball players
Sportspeople from Orenburg Oblast
20th-century Russian women
21st-century Russian women